KJNO (630 AM) is a radio station broadcasting a news/talk/sports format. Licensed to Juneau, Alaska, United States, the station serves the Alaska Panhandle area. The station's studios are at the Juneau Radio Center, which is home to KINY, KTKU - TAKU 105, KSUP - MIX 106 and KXXJ - 1330/KXJ. 
 
The station is owned by Alaska Broadcast Communications, and features programming from CBS News Radio, and ESPN Radio. It carries the nation's biggest talk radio stars; Rush, Laura Ingraham, Sean Hannity, Glenn Beck, Mark Levin and others. KJNO also has a very popular local talk show - Actionline which airs at 11 each weekday.

References

External links
FCC History Cards for KJNO 

1952 establishments in Alaska
ESPN Radio stations
News and talk radio stations in the United States
Radio stations established in 1952
JNO